Budy Milewskie  is a village in the administrative district of Gmina Zawidz, within Sierpc County, Masovian Voivodeship, in east-central Poland.

The village has a population of 110.

External links
 Jewish Community in Budy Milewskie on Virtual Shtetl

References

Budy Milewskie